Samuel Clarence Slaughter (1848 – May 23, 1910) was a New York banker and then a pioneer, real estate investor, and politician in Tacoma, Washington. Slaughter started his career in New York working for the banking firm Norton, Slaughter & Company for more than fifteen years. He came to Tacoma in 1883 and entered real estate. After over twenty years in the field, Slaughter was highly esteemed in Washington state real estate circles. He worked at Moore & Slaughter, and later was the chief partner at S. C. Slaughter & Company. He was known as a figure who contributed to city development and commercial growth. 

Politically, Slaughter was a Democrat, and a member of the Democratic Club of Pierce County. He ran for the position of Tacoma City Controller several times and was elected in 1892, being the only Democratic candidate to succeed in that year's election cycle. He worked as City Controller for two years.

Early life, family and education

Slaughter was born in 1848 in Culpeper County, Virginia, where he grew up and was educated. Slaughter's father was Dr. Phillip C. Slaughter, a Confederate Army surgeon during the American Civil War and a chief surgeon at Camp Lee. His ancestors came from Wales to settle in America in 1620. Slaughter's mother was Mary Slaughter (McDonald), whose ancestors came to America from Scotland.

Career

New York

After getting secondary school education, Slaughter went to New York and became a businessman there. He worked in the well-known banking firm of that time Norton, Slaughter & Company. Slaughter worked and lived in New York for more than fifteen years.

Real estate business

Slaughter moved to Tacoma in 1882, becoming a pioneer real estate businessman of Washington State. At the time of his arrival, the area, was covered in forests.

In one of his first real estate dealings, he sold a lot located at the corner of Pacific Avenue and 11th street. That area later became "one of the most prominent" business areas of Tacoma, and the piece of land sold by Slaughter became the site for the Pacific National Bank.

Slaughter closed many real estate deals for property that later turned into well-known landmarks of the city. According to Prosser, one of the Washington State Historical Society founders, Slaughter closed more deals than the majority of other businessmen in the field at the time.

Around 1884–1885, Slaughter operated from a business building located on the northwest corner of Pacific Avenue and 13th Street. There, he worked in partnership with Henry K. Moore in the real estate and law firm called Moore & Slaughter. By 1903, Slaughter became chief partner in the firm S. C. Slaughter & Company. In his twenty years of real estate dealings in Tacoma, he was considered one of the "most progressive and enterprising citizens," and noted for his contributions to the city's development and commercial growth.

Political activity in Tacoma

Politically, Slaughter was a Democrat and a member of the Democratic Club of Pierce County.

In 1890, Slaughter was nominated for the position of the Chairman of the County Commissioners, but he changed his mind to run in the Tacoma City Controller race. He lost to Republican candidate J. H. Houghton.

On April 5, 1892, Slaughter ran for City Controller again, and this time was elected. He was the only Democratic nominee to succeed in that year's elections, and worked at the position for two years.

Personal life

In 1889, Slaughter married Julia C. Widgery in San Francisco. She was born in England, but later moved to America. She became well known in Tacoma as the founder of the Washington State Cooperative Society, the only female trustee for the Ferry Museum, and the president of the Tacoma Art League (which later developed into the Tacoma Art Museum). 

In 1908, Slaughter was struck and injured by a car belonging to the Tacoma Railway & Power Company. The accident resulted in lawsuit filed in the Superior Court in 1909 for $2,000 ($53,000 in 2020 dollars).

On May 23, 1910, Slaughter died in Tacoma of heart disease.

See also 

 Julia Widgery Slaughter
 Culpeper County, Virginia

Notes

References

Literature cited 

People from Culpeper County, Virginia
Washington (state) pioneers
Businesspeople from Tacoma, Washington
Politicians from Tacoma, Washington
American real estate businesspeople
Businesspeople from New York City
American bankers